The 2008 French Open boys' singles tournament was an event during the 2008 French Open tennis tournament. Vladimir Ignatic was the defending champion, but did not compete in the Juniors in this year.

Tsung-hua Yang won in the final 6–3, 7–6(5), against Jerzy Janowicz.

Seeds

Draw

Final eight

Top half

Section 1

Section 2

Bottom half

Section 3

Section 4

External links
Draw
Qualifying Draw

Boys' Singles
2008